Peter Freeman (May 29, 1965 – March 16, 2021) was an American bassist, composer, and record producer. Based in his studio in Los Angeles, he worked on records, live performance, and film and television soundtracks. He was primarily known for his association with avant-garde composer and trumpet-player Jon Hassell. He was also a regular contributor to Electronic Musician during the 80s and 90s.

Biography 
Freeman began his professional musical career in 1983 as a bassist with Indian electric violinist L. Shankar. From there, he became involved with mainstream musicians, touring with Seal and Pierce Turner, playing with John Cale, Alanis Morissette, Nile Rodgers, Shawn Colvin, Sussan Deyhim, Elliott Sharp. He was a close musical collaborator with Jon Hassell for over 25 years.

He moved to Los Angeles in 2002, where he branched out into film and television as a musician and musical sound designer working with composers such as Thomas Newman, Cliff Martinez, Anton Sanko, Charlie Clouser, Jeff Rona and others.

He, along with David Zicarelli, had been the driving force behind the iPad music sampling and looping application, Looperverse.

Freeman was a licensed amateur radio operator for over 40 years, and held an Extra Class license. He died on March 16, 2021, after a year-long battle with stomach cancer.

In March 2022, two of Freeman's solo albums were announced by Elliott Sharp and posthumously released on zOaR Records as a digital download and a limited edition double-CD. This was released as a double album, titled K3CS.

Discography

Solo works 

 Mercurial (zOaR Records, 2022) - originally recorded in 2000
 Sinistar (zOaR Records, 2022)

Collaborations 
 The Vertical Collection (Earshot Records, 1997)

As contributor 

With Alanis Morissette
 Flavors of Entanglement (Maverick Records, 2008)  – bass

With D-Train
 In Your Eyes (Columbia / EMI, 1989) – additional samples

With Hipsway
 Scratch the Surface (Phonogram, 1989) – bass

With Jan Bang
 …And Poppies From Kandahar (Samadhi Sound, 2010) – bass, electronics

With Jimmy Mbaye
 Dakar Heart (Shanachie, 1994) – bass

With Jon Hassell
 Dressing for Pleasure (Warner Bros., 1994) – bass
 Maarifa Street: Magic Realism Volume Two (Nyen, 2005) – co-producer, bass, percussion, programming, mixing
 Last Night the Moon Came Dropping Its Clothes in the Street (ECM Records, 2009) – co-producer, bass, guitar, samples, percussion, mixing
 Listening to Pictures (Pentimento Volume One) (Ndeya, 2018) – bass
 Seeing Through Sound (Pentimento Volume Two) (Ndeya, 2020) – bass

With Phoebe Legere
 Phoebe Legere (Dead Dog Records, 1993) – bass

With Richard Horowitz and Sussan Deyhim
 Majoun (Sony Classical, 2005) – overtone bass

With Richard Shindell
 Blue Divide (Shanachie, 1994) – synthesizer

With Rick Cox
 Fade (Cold Blue Music, 2005) – co-producer, mixing

With Seal
 Newborn Friend (ZTT, 1994) – bass & appears in the official video
 I'm Alive (ZTT, 1994) – bass

With Shawn Colvin
 Cover Girl (Columbia, 1994) – digital editing

 As mixing engineer 

With Erik Sanko
 Past Imperfect, Present Tense (Jetset Records, 2001)

With Veruca Salt
 Lords of Sounds and Lesser Things (Velveteen, 2005)

 Filmography 

 Collaborations 
 The Deep and Dreamless Sleep (2006) – with Lee Curreri and Jeff Rona

 As contributor 

 The Million Dollar Hotel : "Amsterdam Blue (Cortège)" (2000)
 Saw (2004) – bass scrapes
 Traffic (2004) – bass
 Saw II (2005) – musician
 Saw III (2006) – additional score performer / musical sound designer (uncredited)
 Dead Silence (2007) – additional score sound design
 Death Sentence (2007) – musical sound design
 Resident Evil: Extinction (2007) – processed guitars
 Saw IV (2007) – original score performer
 Saw V (2008) – guitar
 Severe Clear (2009) – music programmer
 Saw VI (2009) – guitars
 Saw: The Final Chapter (2010) – guitars
 The Lincoln Lawyer (2011) – guitar
 The Company You Keep (2012) – title sequence drum
 Jessabelle (2014) – additional electronic textures
 Visions (2015) – score mixing
 The Neighbor (2016) – additional music
 The Drowning (2016) – score mixing
 Jigsaw (2017) – weird guitar samples
 Fractured (2019) – processed bass and additional textures
 Spiral: From the Book of Saw (2021) – additional musical sound design

 Television 

 As contributor 
 Alpha House (2013) – score mixing, electric bass, upright bass, guitar
 Big Love (2006) – musical sound design
 Great Migrations (2010) – guitar, bass, programming
 Las Vegas (2003) – guitar, bass, programming
 NUMB3RS (2005) – bass, programming
 The Romanoffs (2018) – score mixing
 Traffic'' (2004) – musical sound design (uncredited)

References

External links 
 
 
 

1965 births
2021 deaths
21st-century American male musicians
21st-century American bass guitarists
21st-century American keyboardists
Amateur radio people
American audio engineers
American multi-instrumentalists
American people of English-Jewish descent
Deaths from cancer in California
Deaths from stomach cancer
Record producers from New York (state)
Musicians from New York City
Remixers
The High School of Music & Art alumni